This is an incomplete list of former heads of regimes, like presidents, prime ministers and monarchs, who were sentenced to death by the succeeding regime.

See also
List of heads of regimes who were later imprisoned

Footnotes

External links
 The lives, deaths of dictators

Former heads of regimes who were sentenced to death
Former heads of regimes who were sentenced to death
Lists of people by cause of death